Willard T. Stevens (September 6, 1865 – April 26, 1937) was a member of the Wisconsin State Senate.

Biography
Stevens was born on September 6, 1865 in Beetown, Wisconsin. His father, Daniel Bartlett Stevens, was a member of the Wisconsin State Assembly. On July 11, 1888, Stevens married Katherine Grimm. He died in Rhinelander, Wisconsin in 1937.

Career
Stevens was elected to the Senate in 1912 and remained a member until 1918. Previously, he was elected Sheriff of Oneida County, Wisconsin in 1896 and re-elected in 1906 and was a member of the Wisconsin Republican Committee from 1904 to 1906.

References

People from Beetown, Wisconsin
People from Oneida County, Wisconsin
Republican Party Wisconsin state senators
Wisconsin sheriffs
1865 births
1937 deaths